Davide Ballardini (born 6 January 1964) is an Italian football manager. He formerly played professionally for Cesena as a midfielder. He is currently the head coach of  club Cremonese.

Playing career
A former midfielder, Ballardini spent seven years as a player with Cesena, under youth team coach Arrigo Sacchi and first team coach Osvaldo Bagnoli, which are often cited by him as his personal mentors.

Coaching career
Ballardini started his coaching career serving as youth team coach for Bologna, and successively Cesena and A.C. Milan. He then worked as Parma under-19 youth team coach from 2002 to 2004. He was then appointed by Sambenedettese as new head coach for the 2004–05 season, ended with an impressive fourth place and the consequent participation in the promotion playoffs, then lost to Napoli in the semi-final. He was subsequently chosen by Massimo Cellino as new Cagliari boss for their 2005–06 Serie A campaign, being however sacked only a few weeks later, on 11 November, and replaced by Nedo Sonetti.

Ballardini started the 2006–07 season at the helm of Serie B side Pescara, where he however lasted only until October, following a very unimpressive beginning in the league. He was surprisingly announced as new boss of last-placed Serie A team Cagliari on 27 December 2007, succeeding Sonetti, who ironically replaced him during his first period at the helm of the Sardinian side. Under his tenure as head coach, Cagliari dramatically improved their results, winning 32 points in 21 weeks, thus rising up the table and managing to escape relegation in advance of a week. However, Ballardini failed to find an agreement with Cagliari chairman Massimo Cellino for a contract extension, and they ultimately decided to part company on 28 May.

On 4 September 2008 Palermo announced to have dismissed head coach Stefano Colantuono, appointing Ballardini as new rosanero boss in a one-year contract. In his debut match with Palermo, Ballardini led the Sicilians to a very impressive 3–1 home win to A.S. Roma, and then went on to impose the first seasonal loss to Juventus, winning 2–1 in Turin, this being the first time Palermo won at Juventus' home in 47 years. His ability to recover Palermo, leading them to the top league positions, was quickly praised once again by the media. On 7 October, just two days after the rosanero triumph in Turin, Palermo announced to have agreed a two-year contract extension with Ballardini.

After weeks of rumours regarding a possible departure of Ballardini from Palermo at the end of the season, on 30 May the rosanero head coach announced he had agreed for a 10-day period to give a definite answer to the club regarding his intentions. Later that day, Palermo chairman Maurizio Zamparini announced Ballardini had asked to be relieved from his position due to his unwillingness to keep on serving as Palermo head coach. A few days later, on 5 June, Palermo unveiled Walter Zenga as new head coach, thus ending speculation regarding Ballardini's future with the rosanero. Despite being dismissed as head coach following these events, Ballardini was however still under a contract for two more years with the Sicilian club.

Finally, after long rumours connecting Ballardini's name as the next coach of Lazio following Delio Rossi's departure, he was appointed as the new manager of the Roman club on 15 June 2009. He signed a two-year contract with an option for a third worth €750,000 per year.

On his first competitive match as Lazio boss, Ballardini led the club to triumph in the 2009 Supercoppa Italiana, as his side won 2–1 to outgoing Italian champions Inter in a single-legged game played at Beijing National Stadium, Beijing, China. However, Ballardini did not repeat this triumph in Serie A level, and also failed to qualify to the 2009–10 UEFA Europa League knockout round. Later in January and February a number of disappointing results left Lazio in 18th place, in danger of being relegated, leading club chairman Claudio Lotito to dismiss Ballardini and appoint Edy Reja as new head coach.

On 8 November 2010 Ballardini returned into management, accepting an offer as head coach of Serie A club Genoa. He signed a two-year contract with the club, but club president Enrico Preziosi terminated the contract with him for no particular reason on 5 June 2011.

On 9 November 2011, Ballardini returned to manage Cagliari for the third time in his career. He was dismissed for just cause on 11 March 2012.

On 21 January 2013, Ballardini returned to Genoa to try and save them from relegation. He has managed to do so with still one game to go. Nevertheless, chairman Preziosi may decide yet again to let him go at the end of the season. Ballardini is loved by many Genoa supporters for his manners and his energy on the pitch. Many want him to lead Genoa next season too.

On 8 January 2014, Serie A club Bologna announced that Ballardini agreed a 6-month deal to coach their first team.

On 10 November 2015, he became the manager of Palermo. He was later relieved of his duties on 11 January 2016, one day after having been publicly accused of unprofessionalism by team captain Stefano Sorrentino in the wake of a 1–0 away win at Verona.

On 12 April 2016, he was rehired as coach of Palermo after the sacking of Walter Novellino, the ninth managerial change for the club during the 2015–16 season.

On 21 December 2020, Ballardini was appointed as manager of Genoa, beginning his fourth spell with the club. He was sacked on 6 November 2021 due to negative results in the 2021–22 Serie A season.

On 15 January 2023, Ballardini returned into management as the new head coach of bottom-placed Serie A club Cremonese, signing a contract until 30 June 2024.

Personal life
Ballardini was born in Ravenna. He has three sons, all of them being footballers: Leo Natale (born 1990) played in the role of striker for Igea Virtus and Elia (born 1991, striker) for Virtus Entella, whereas Erik (born 1995, midfielder) are currently part of Cesena youth ranks.

Managerial statistics

Honours

As manager
Lazio
 Supercoppa Italiana: 2009

References

1964 births
Living people
Sportspeople from Ravenna
Italian football managers
A.S. Sambenedettese managers
Delfino Pescara 1936 managers
Cagliari Calcio managers
Palermo F.C. managers
Genoa C.F.C. managers
Serie A managers
A.C. Cesena players
Italian footballers
S.S. Lazio managers
Bologna F.C. 1909 managers
U.S. Cremonese players
Association football midfielders
Footballers from Emilia-Romagna